Stephen Ayodele Makinwa (born 26 July 1983) is a retired Nigerian footballer who played as a striker. Makinwa also played for the Nigerian national team. His name, Ayodele, means "Joy has come home".

Club career

Early career
Makinwa was born in Lagos, Nigeria. Discovered in 2000 by Reggiana while playing for Nigerian local side Ebedei alongside his childhood friend and teammate Obafemi Martins, Makinwa started his Italian football experience moving on loan to Serie D team Conegliano.

In 2001, he moved to Serie B team Como squad, as Como bought 50% of the rights to the player, however, Makinwa did not play any games for the team.

In 2002, he was back to Reggiana, in Serie C1, but the following season he was again in Como, but now as a regular.

Genoa and loans
Como bought the remainder of the 50% ownership rights from Reggiana in June and sold him to Genoa in August 2003. In the first half of the season, he was remained on loan at Como. In January 2004 Makinwa was loaned to Modena and made his debut in Serie A. In the 2004–05 season, he returned to Genoa and scored 6 goals in the first half of the Serie B season. That season, Genoa also owned effective strikers Diego Milito and Roberto Stellone.

Atalanta & Palermo
In January 2005 Makinwa moved to Atalanta in a joint-ownership bid, but Atalanta was relegated in June 2005, although the club decided to buy the remaining rights on 27 June.

In July 2005, Makinwa joined Palermo for a reported €7.5 million transfer fee. He only remained at Palermo for a season, however he showed enough promise to suggest that he could develop into a quality Serie A player, scoring 5 goals in 23 league matches as Palermo qualified for Europe and 3 goals in the Uefa cup.

Lazio
Makinwa then went to S.S. Lazio in summer 2006, on a co-ownership deal for €3.3 million, being reunited with Delio Rossi, his former coach at Atalanta. In June 2007, he was fully contracted by Lazio, following a blind auction between the biancocelesti and Palermo, for another €3.3 million. He also signed a new five-year contract.

In 2007–08, Makinwa got his first experience of the UEFA Champions League, failing to score as Lazio crashed out in the group stages. Following six months of unconvincing performances, Lazio sent him on loan to relegation battlers Reggina, but he still did not find the net, ending the season without a goal to his name.

He began the 2008–09 season as a fringe player at Lazio; making just four substitute appearances.

On 22 January 2009, it was announced that Makinwa had signed for Chievo until the end of the 2008–09 season, for €250,000. The deal was a loan, with an option of making the move permanent, although Chievo decided not to sign the Nigerian and he returned to Lazio for the 2009–10

AE Larisa
On 15 July 2010, Makinwa joined Larissa on loan from Lazio until the end of the season.

Beijing Baxy
Following the end of his contract with Lazio, Makinwa joined China League One side Beijing Baxy until the end of the 2014 season scoring 4 goals in his first 9 games.

Gorica
In July 2014 he was signed by Slovenian side ND Gorica.

International career
Makinwa played for the Nigerian national team and won 14 caps since making his debut in 2004.

He played for Nigeria in the 2006 African Cup of Nations when they finished third. Two years on, he played in the side which again failed to win, losing at the 2008 African Cup of Nations to Ghana.

Both Makinwa and his national teammate Obafemi Martins, are known for celebrating goals by making several consecutive somersaults.

Club statistics

References

External links
 



1983 births
Living people
Nigerian footballers
Nigerian expatriate footballers
Expatriate footballers in Italy
Nigeria international footballers
2006 Africa Cup of Nations players
2008 Africa Cup of Nations players
Sportspeople from Lagos
F.C.D. Conegliano Calcio 1907 players
A.C. Reggiana 1919 players
Genoa C.F.C. players
Atalanta B.C. players
Palermo F.C. players
S.S. Lazio players
Reggina 1914 players
Serie A players
Serie B players
Slovenian PrvaLiga players
Como 1907 players
Modena F.C. players
A.C. ChievoVerona players
Yoruba sportspeople
Expatriate footballers in Greece
Athlitiki Enosi Larissa F.C. players
Super League Greece players
Beijing Sport University F.C. players
China League One players
Expatriate footballers in China
Expatriate footballers in Slovenia
ND Gorica players
F.C. Ebedei players
Association football forwards